Marchevo is a small village in Garmen Municipality, in Blagoevgrad Province, Bulgaria. The village is situated between Garmen and Ognyanovo and the tree villages are almost merged. There is a significant Romani minority, living in the eastern part of the village.  The church "Nativity of Virgin Mary" was built in 1908 over the foundations of an older church. The school in the village was closed in 2002. There isn't also a kindergarten. There is a hotel and guest-houses.

References

Villages in Blagoevgrad Province